St. George's Church  (Georgian: წმინდა გიორგის სახელობის ეკლესია) is located in the village of Kvirike, Georgia. It is the new church rebuilt by local Greeks on the site of old ruins of the 12th century. The church houses the miraculous icon of St. George. The day of the temple is celebrated on 16 November.

See also 
List of tallest churches
List of large Orthodox cathedrals

External links 
 Religious Places In kobuleti

Georgian Orthodox churches in Georgia (country)